Lady Rose Sophia Mary Weigall, née Fane (5 September 1834 – 14 February 1921) was a British philanthropist and the biographer of Princess Charlotte of Wales.

Life
Weigall was born in London. Her parents were Priscilla Anne Fane (born Wellesley-Pole) and John Fane. They were Lord and Lady Burghersh and she was the last of their nine children. Her mother's uncle was the Duke of Wellington. In 1841 she moved to Berlin where her father was a minister and she and her family were there until 1851 when they moved to Vienna where her father was the British ambassador during the Crimean war. In Vienna she wrote to Princess Luise of Prussia, continuing a friendship that was to be a lifelong correspondence between them. She also continued her education with German and Swiss tutors.

When her father, who was then the eleventh earl of Westmorland, died in 1855,  she moved with her mother to London. There she met William Gladstone, Palmerston and Henry Weigall. Weigall was a popular portrait painter. They married and eventually had seven children including the cricketer Gerry Weigall and Sir Archibald Weigall in 1874 who was later governor of Australia. They bought Southwood House in Ramsgate as the family home in 1880.

Her family as the Earls of Westmoreland had a country residence at Apethorpe in Northamptonshire and she took her responsibilities as part of the landowning family seriously. An article she wrote in 1869 spoke of 'Our friends in the village' which included the poor people of Apethorpe. She also had concerns in Europe, but never went abroad after her marriage. She was aware of the need to keep her mind active and she gave her time to history, correspondence and literary interests. She wrote and her ideas were published in Macmillan's Magazine. Under the encouragement of Queen Victoria she wrote a biography of Princess Charlotte who had died in childbirth. It was titled A Brief Memoir of the Princess Charlotte of Wales and she presented a copy to the Queen in August 1874.

Weigall died at Southwood in Ramsgate. The Thanet Advertiser reported in its obituary of Weigall that she was active on the Board of Guardians of Nethercoat VAD Hospital, and that she knitted mittens and socks for soldiers who had been injured and as a result needed to have them made in different sizes and shapes. She also supported the local Cottage homes.

References

1834 births
1921 deaths
People from London
Literary editors
Biographers
Daughters of British earls
Rose